Route 969, or Highway 969, may refer to:

United States
  in Florida
  in Louisiana
  in Maryland
  in Pennsylvania
  in Puerto Rico
  in Texas